The 2000 Fusagasugá City Council election was held on Sunday, 29 October 2000, to elect the City Council. At stake were all 15 seats in the City Council. The Liberal Party has held to Luis Cifuentes as President of Council from 2001 to 2002. The next President of Council was Chipatecua until his death in November 2002.

Results

References

Regional elections
2000